The Frasch process is a method to extract sulfur from underground deposits. It is the only industrial method of recovering sulfur from elemental deposits. Most of the world's sulfur was obtained this way until the late 20th century, when sulfur recovered from petroleum and gas sources became more commonplace (see Claus process).

In the Frasch process, superheated water is pumped into the sulfur deposit; the sulfur melts and is extracted. The Frasch process is able to produce high-purity sulfur.

History

The Frasch sulfur process works best on either salt domes or bedded evaporite deposits, where sulfur is found in permeable rock layers trapped in between impermeable layers. Bacterial alteration of anhydrite or gypsum, in the presence of hydrocarbons, produces limestone and hydrogen sulfide in the sulfur cycle. The hydrogen sulfide then oxidizes into sulfur, from percolating water, or through the action of anaerobic, sulfur-reducing bacteria 

In 1867, miners discovered sulfur in the caprock of a salt dome in Calcasieu Parish, Louisiana, but it was beneath quicksand, which prevented mining. In 1894 the German-born American chemist, Herman Frasch (1852–1914), devised his Frasch method of sulfur removal using pipes to bypass the quicksand. This replaced the inefficient and polluting Sicilian method.  The process proved successful, on December 24, 1894, when the first molten sulfur was brought to the surface.  The Union Sulphur Company was incorporated in 1896 to utilize the process.  However, the high cost of fuel needed to heat the water made the process uneconomic until the 1901 discovery of the Spindletop oil field in Texas provided cheap fuel oil to the region.  The Frasch process began economic production at Sulphur Mines, Louisiana in 1903.

When Frasch's patent expired, the process was widely applied to similar salt-dome sulfur deposits along the Gulf Coast of the United States.  The second Frasch-process mine opened in 1912 in Brazoria County, Texas.  The Gulf Coast came to dominate world sulfur production in the early and middle 20th century.  However, starting in the 1970s, byproduct sulfur recovery from oil and natural gas lowered the price of sulfur and drove many Frasch-process mines out of business.  The last United States Frasch sulfur mine closed in 2000. A Frasch mine in Iraq closed in 2003 due to the U.S. invasion of Iraq.

The Frasch process is still used to work sulfur deposits in Mexico, Ukraine and Poland.

Process

In the Frasch process, three concentric tubes are introduced into the sulfur deposit. Superheated water (165 °C, 2.5-3 MPa) is injected into the deposit via the outermost tube. Sulfur (m.p. 115 °C) melts and flows into the middle tube. Water pressure alone is unable to force the sulfur into the surface due to the molten sulfur's greater density, so hot air is introduced via the innermost tube to froth the sulfur, making it less dense, and pushing it to the surface.

The sulfur obtained can be very pure (99.7 - 99.8%). In this form, it is light yellow in color. If contaminated by organic compounds, it can be dark-colored; further purification is not economic, and usually unnecessary. Using this method, the United States produced 3.89 million tons of sulfur in 1989, and Mexico produced 1.02 million tons of sulfur in 1991.

The Frasch process can be used for deposits 50–800 meters deep. 3-38 cubic meters of superheated water are required to produce every tonne of sulfur, and the associated energy cost is significant. A working demonstration model of the Frasch process suitable for the classroom has been described.

References

Further reading

History of Sulphur (Sulphur, Louisiana)

External links
 (Description of Frasch process)

Industrial processes
Sulfur mining